The Oppo Neo 5 (2015) and Oppo Neo 5s are refreshes of the Oppo Neo 5. The key difference between the refreshed 5 and 5s models is the 4G connectivity in the 5s, which the 5 lacks. The 5 and 5s cost €70 and €160, respectively.

References 

Oppo smartphones
Mobile phones introduced in 2015
Android (operating system) devices
Discontinued smartphones